Luke Lee Wen Loong (born December 16, 1991) is a Singaporean actor and lawyer, best known for his role as Sergeant Heng in Jack Neo's army movies Ah Boys to Men and Ah Boys to Men 2. He has also appeared in Hong Kong-Singapore horror film A Fantastic Ghost Wedding. Notable roles include appearing in MediaCorp Channel 5's Tanglin, HBO (Asia)'s Serangoon Road as well as BBC's Insatiable Teens.

Career 

Law

Lee studied law at the University of Manchester and obtained his Bachelor of Laws with Honours in 2015. Lee completed his Bar Examinations and was called to the Singapore Bar as a qualified lawyer.

Acting

Lee first appeared on television as the host of the 2009 Asian Youth Games, part of Singapore's bid to host the 2010 Summer Youth Olympics. His first screen acting role was in 2012 in an SPCA pet adoption commercial. Lee's first film credit was 2012's Ah Boys to Men, playing the supporting role of Sergeant Heng. The film was a commercial success, despite mixed critical reviews. In 2013, Lee reprised his role in its sequel, Ah Boys to Men 2. As of January 2013, Ah Boys to Men has grossed $6.18 million domestically, and Ah Boys to Men 2 has grossed $7.9 million, remaining the biggest local box office  and the highest grossing Singaporean film to date.

Lee appeared in several MediaCorp programmes such as Tanglin, Point of Entry, Unnatural, On the Edge, Step Puteri. Lee also appeared in the music video for the theme song of Ah Boys to Men, titled "Recruit's Anthem".

In 2014, Lee starred in an international commercial for Manchester United, directed by Joaquín Baca-Asay starring Wayne Rooney, Robin Van Persie, Ryan Giggs & football legend Bobby Charlton. In the same year, Lee landed a role in A Fantastic Ghost Wedding, a Hong Kong-Singapore horror film directed by Meng Ong. The film was selected for development by the Sundance Institute Screenwriting Lab, and the Taiwan Golden Horse Film Project Promotion.

In 2015, Lee starred as the lead in Kan Lume's Fragment, an anthology film celebrating the strength and diversity of South-East Asian independent cinema and commissioned by the Asian Film Archive. That same year, he also starred in four episodes of Tanglin, as Alfred Soh.

In a 2016 interview with The New Paper for his upcoming movie Burn, Lee stated "I'm a huge fan of action films. I also feel that Singapore hasn't had a defining action film that truly sets the standards on an international stage. Our neighbouring countries like Indonesia and Thailand are able to do that and with a lower budget (compared to Hollywood). We are perfectly placed on the map so I thought, 'Why don't we pull in resources from all over the globe to make (a movie like that)?'". Lee is in talks to produce and star in Burn, directed by James Lee.

In 2018, Lee played James Lee in the Singapore romantic comedy series 20 Days, starring Felicia Chin and Elvin Ng.

Personal life 
Lee attended National Junior College. During his university studies, Lee trained at the Bristol Old Vic Theatre School and LAMDA, and attended open casting calls, where he gained his first agent, David Daly Associates.

Filmography

References

External links 
 

1991 births
Singaporean people of Chinese descent
Singaporean male television actors
Singaporean male film actors
Living people
National Junior College alumni